The men's 100 metre breaststroke competition of the swimming events at the 1967 Pan American Games took place on 30 July at the Pan Am Pool. It was the first appearance of this event in the Pan American Games.

This race consisted of two lengths of the pool, both lengths being in breaststroke.

Results
All times are in minutes and seconds.

Heats

Final 
The final was held on July 30.

References

Swimming at the 1967 Pan American Games